Gorayk Municipality, referred to as Gorayk Community ( Gorayk Hamaynk), is a rural community and administrative subdivision of Syunik Province of Armenia, at the south of the country. Consisted of a group of settlements, its administrative centre is the village of Gorayk.

Included settlements

See also
Syunik Province

References

Communities in Syunik Province
2016 establishments in Armenia